Quon could refer to 

 Guan, a Chinese family name rendered in Cantonese as Kwan, or also in English as Quan or Quon
 Quon Kisaragi, a fictional character in the manga/novel series RahXephon
Nissan Diesel Quon, a line of heavy-duty commercial vehicles
 Ontario v. Quon, a 2010 U.S. Supreme Court decision on electronic privacy
 A quantum object, as identified in the book Quantum Reality by physicist Nick Herbert.

See also
 Quan (disambiguation)
 Guan (disambiguation)

zh:管姓